Bhanvad railway station  is a railway station serving in Devbhumi Dwarka district of Gujarat state of India. It is under Bhavnagar railway division of Western Railway zone of Indian Railways. Passenger, Express and Superfast trains halt here.

Major trains 

Following major trains halt at Bhanvad railway station in both direction:

 19015/16 Porbandar–Mumbai Central Saurashtra Express
 12905 Howrah–Porbandar Express
 19263/64 Porbandar–Delhi Sarai Rohilla Express
 19269/70 Porbandar–Muzaffarpur Express

References

Railway stations in Devbhoomi Dwarka district
Bhavnagar railway division